Camp Branch is a  long 2nd order tributary to the Fisher River in Surry County, North Carolina.

Course
Camp Branch rises on the Blue Ridge Mountain escarpment about 1.5 miles southwest of Fisher Peak.  Camp Branch then flows southwest to join the Fisher River about 2 miles southeast of Lowgap, North Carolina.

Watershed
Camp Branch drains  of area, receives about 47.8 in/year of precipitation, has a wetness index of 277.75, and is about 85% forested.

See also
List of rivers of North Carolina

References

Rivers of North Carolina
Rivers of Surry County, North Carolina